Made in U.S.A. is a 1987 American crime drama / black comedy film directed by Ken Friedman from a screenplay by Zbigniew Kempinski. The film stars Adrian Pasdar and Chris Penn as two young men who decide to leave behind their working-class lives in the coal-mining country of Pennsylvania and travel to California. Along the way, they pick up a hitchhiker (Lori Singer) and embark on a crime spree. The soundtrack features several songs by the American band Sonic Youth, who in 1995 released an album (also titled Made in USA) of all the songs they had recorded for the film.

The release of the film was delayed because of a dispute over artistic control between Friedman and John Daly of Hemdale Films. Friedman first showed his version, without the permission of Hemdale, who held the copyright, at the 1987 Cannes Film Festival. Daly released the studio's version to video in 1989.

The film was originally entitled USA Today, but the publishers of the USA Today newspaper, Gannett Company sued the film's producers, Hemdale Film Corporation, for the use of the name for one of the company's features. As a condition of the settlement, Hemdale decided to rename the title to Made in U.S.A., according to documents filed in federal court.

References

External links 

1987 films
American crime comedy-drama films
American black comedy films
1980s crime comedy-drama films
Films produced by Charles Roven
1980s black comedy films
1980s English-language films
1980s American films